Kennie Knak Chopart (born 1 June 1990) is a Danish professional football forward who plays in the Besta deildin for Knattspyrnufélag Reykjavíkur. Having previously played for rival Reykjavík side Ungmennafélagið Fjölnir, he transferred to KR Reykjavik in 2016.   In July 2016, he scored two goals in a Europa League qualifying game against Glenavon

Notes

Living people
1990 births
Danish men's footballers
Esbjerg fB players
Danish Superliga players
Expatriate footballers in Iceland
Expatriate footballers in Norway
Stjarnan players
Arendal Fotball players
Association football forwards
People from Ringkøbing-Skjern Municipality
Sportspeople from the Central Denmark Region